Tsandi Constituency is an electoral constituency in the Omusati Region of Namibia. It had 26,834 inhabitants in 2004 and 15,618 registered voters . Its district capital is the settlement of Tsandi.

The constituency contains the village of Omugulugwombashe, the place where the first armed battle in the Namibian struggle for independence took place.

Politics
Tsandi constituency is traditionally a stronghold of the South West Africa People's Organization (SWAPO) party. In the 2015 local and regional elections SWAPO candidate Junias Amunkete won uncontested and became councillor after no opposition party nominated a candidate. Councillor Amunkete (SWAPO) was reelected in the 2020 regional election. He obtained 7,186 voted, far ahead of independent candidate Saara Amutenya with 360 votes and Natangwe Neingo of the Independent Patriots for Change (IPC), an opposition party formed in August 2020, with 313 votes.

References

Constituencies of Omusati Region
States and territories established in 1992
1992 establishments in Namibia